Svetlana Vladimirovna Kapanina is a Russian aerobatic pilot.

Biography
Kapanina was born on 28 December 1968 in Shchuchinsk, Kazakh SSR, Soviet Union (now Kazakhstan). She dedicated herself to several sports modalities at school and always liked motorcycles and other motor vehicles. She enrolled at medical school in Tselinograd (now Astana), where she graduated in pharmaceutical sciences. She started flying at age 19, in 1988, on a Sukhoi Su-26M3, while working as a technician at the Kurgan sports aviation club of DOSAAF. By 1991 she was already an instructor pilot at DOSAAF's Irkutsk club, and then back at Kurgan. Also in 1991, she became a member of the Russian national aerobatic team. In 1995 she graduated from Kaluga aeronautical technical school.

She lives in Moscow with her husband and two children.

Achievements in aerobatics

Kapanina was World Aerobatic Champion in the women's category in 1996, 1998, 2001, 2003, 2005, 2007 and 2011 and has won the title more times than any other pilot in the category. Additionally, she was overall World Air Games Champion in 1997 and 2001.

Together with Mikhail Mamistov and Oleg Spolyansky, she won the team gold medal in the 16th FAI European Aerobatic Championships 2008 in Hradec Králové (Czech Republic). She placed fourth overall and was best female participant.

Awards

In 1997, she received the Paul Tissandier Diploma by the Fédération Aéronautique Internationale (FAI). In 2005 she was awarded the Sabiha Gökçen Medal and the Centenary Medal by the FAI. She was awarded Russia's Order of Courage by President Vladimir Putin on 22 December 2014.

See also
 Competition aerobatics
 FAI World Aerobatic Championships
 FAI European Aerobatic Championships

References

External links
  Official website

Aerobatic pilots
Russian aviators
People from Akmola Region
Sportspeople from Moscow
1968 births
Living people
Russian women aviators
21st-century Russian women